Todd J. Martínez is a David Mulvane Ehrsam and Edward Curtis Franklin Professor of Chemistry at Stanford University and a Professor of Photon Science at the SLAC National Accelerator Laboratory.

Education
He attended Carol Morgan School in the Dominican Republic  before receiving his B.S. from  Calvin College in 1989 and his Ph.D. from UCLA in 1994. He was a Fulbright Fellow at the Fritz Haber Institute for Molecular Dynamics at Hebrew University in Jerusalem, Israel and later a University of California Presidential Postdoctoral Fellow at UCLA.

Career
Afteer completing his postdoctoral fellowships, Martínez joined the faculty at the University of Illinois in 1996. He was named a Gutgsell Professor of Chemistry at the University of Illinois in 2006. He joined the Stanford faculty in 2009.
Martínez was appointed a co-editor of the Annual Review of Physical Chemistry in 2012 and is credited beginning with its 2014 issue.

Professor Martínez is a theoretical chemist whose research focuses primarily on developing first-principles approaches to chemical reaction dynamics, starting from the fundamental equations of quantum mechanics. He is particularly interested in electronically excited states and the response of molecules to light.  Reactions of electronically excited molecules often involve conical intersections, around which the potential energy surfaces have the shape of intersecting cones. He developed a method known as ab initio multiple spawning, or AIMS, which predicts the dynamic evolution of systems having conical intersections. He has created models for photoinduced isomerization in retinal, which represents the biophysical basis for vision.  He has also shown how videogame hardware, especially graphical processing units (GPUs), can be used to accelerate quantum chemistry simulations.

Martínez's research has been supported by an NSF Career Award, a MacArthur Foundation Fellowship,  a Packard Foundation Fellowship, a Sloan Foundation Fellowship, a Beckman Young Investigators Award, a Research Innovation Award, a Dreyfus Teacher-Scholar Award, and grants from the NSF, DOE, NIH, Research Corporation, and the Human Frontier Science Program (HFSP).  He was elected to the American Academy of Arts & Sciences in 2011 and to the National Academy of Sciences in 2019.

Representative publications
 Insights for Light-Driven Molecular Devices from Ab Initio Multiple Spawning Dynamics, T. J. Martínez, Acc. Chem. Res., 39, 119 (2006). 
 Competitive Decay at Two and Three-State Conical Intersections in Excited State Intramolecular Proton Transfer, J. D. Coe and T. J. Martínez, J. Am. Chem. Soc. 127, 4560 (2005). 
 Conical Intersection Dynamics in Solution: The Chromophore of Green Fluorescent Protein, A. Toniolo, S. Olsen, L. Manohar, and T. J. Martínez, Faraday Disc., 127, 149 (2004).

References

Group Web Site
http://mtzweb.stanford.edu/

Living people
Calvin University alumni
MacArthur Fellows
Stanford University Department of Chemistry faculty
SLAC Linear Accelerator Laboratory
1968 births
American physical chemists
Theoretical chemists
Computational chemists
Hispanic and Latino American scientists
Annual Reviews (publisher) editors